Riccardo Bugari (born 6 February 1991) is an Italian speed skater. He competed in the 2018 Winter Olympics.

References

1991 births
Living people
Speed skaters at the 2018 Winter Olympics
Italian male speed skaters
Olympic speed skaters of Italy